"Let the Heartache Ride" is the debut single by American country music group Restless Heart, released in January 1985 from their self-titled debut album. The song was written by Van Stephenson, Dave Robbins and Tim DuBois. It reached number 23 on the Billboard Hot Country Singles & Tracks chart.

Chart performance

References

1985 songs
1985 debut singles
Restless Heart songs
Songs written by Tim DuBois
Songs written by Dave Robbins (keyboardist)
Songs written by Van Stephenson
Song recordings produced by Scott Hendricks
RCA Records singles